Qikiqtaryuaq, formerly Jenny Lind Island, for the Swedish born opera singer, Jenny Lind, is a small island  in the Kitikmeot Region of Nunavut, Canada.

The island is the site of CAM-1A (Jenny Lind Island), a former Distant Early Warning Line site and home to the unmanned North Warning System site.

Geography

Characteristics of the terrain include rocky ridges, low-lying wetlands, sedge meadows, and a sandy shoreline.

Fauna

Qikiqtaryuaq is a Canadian Important Bird Area (#NU088), and a Key Migratory Terrestrial Bird Site. Notable bird species include Canada goose, lesser snow goose, and Ross's goose.

Muskoxen are found in the south east section of the island.

Climate

History
The island is uninhabited but still has an active North Warning System. Originally part of the Distant Early Warning Line, the site is known as CAM-1.

References

The Atlas of Canada - Sea Islands
Kitikmeot Regional Land Use Plan
CAM-1 plan

Uninhabited islands of Kitikmeot Region
Victoria Island (Canada)
Important Bird Areas of Kitikmeot Region
Former populated places in the Kitikmeot Region
Jenny Lind
Important Bird Areas of Arctic islands